= Ayyappankave =

- village
- Location in Kerala, India Ayyappankave (India)
- Coordinates: 10°46′0″N 76°37′0″E
- Country: India
- State: Kerala
- District: Palakkad

Government
  - Type: Panchayati raj (India)
  - Body: Gram panchayat

Languages
  - Official: Malayalam, English
- Time zone: UTC+5:30 (IST)
- Vehicle registration: KL-

Ayyappankave is a village in the Palakkad district, Kerala, India. The village is about 20 kilometers from Palakkad.
